Stictosia flava is a moth in the family Erebidae first described by van Eecke in 1927. It is found on Sumatra and Borneo. The habitat consists of lower montane forests.

References

Moths described in 1927
Nudariina